Allan Callow (born 21 September 1929) is a former Australian rules footballer who played for the St Kilda Football Club in the Victorian Football League (VFL).

Notes

External links 

Living people
1929 births
Australian rules footballers from Victoria (Australia)
St Kilda Football Club players